Glen Cove Christian Academy was a private, non-denominational, Christian boarding and day school for grades nine through twelve. The school was founded in 1958 in Glen Cove, Maine under the leadership of Harold Duff and Arthur Fish. The school was forced to close its doors in 1979.

Campus
During its twenty-year history, the campus was developed to include a gymnasium and soccer field, an academy boys dormitory, a co-ed Bible college dormitory, and an academy classroom building, Tracey Hall.  The thirty-five room Warrenton Cottage housed the kitchen, dining halls, library, administrative offices, academy girls dormitory, and a snack bar/recreation center.  The former carriage house was renovated to provide Bible college classrooms, library, and chapel for both schools.  A capital campaign was begun in 1976 to provide funding for a multi-purpose building housing a new kitchen, dining hall, and larger chapel necessitated by increasing enrollment in both schools.  Due to the closure of the schools in 1979 the chapel complex was never completed.

Activities
The academy fielded a variety of interscholastic sports teams.  They were active participants in the State Principal's Association sports leagues as a Class S school.  Girls teams included basketball, softball, and volleyball teams.  Boys teams included cross country, soccer, basketball, baseball, and volleyball.  The boys basketball team reached Class S/D state tournament status in 1964, 1965, and 1976.  In 1969, the boys varsity basketball team won the Western Maine Class D Runner-up trophy.  In 1977, the boys team won the Western Maine Class D Title, but lost to Eastern Maine champs, Jonesport-Beals in the Class D State Championship contest. In 1978, the boys team lost to Oak Grove-Coburn in the Western Maine Semifinal matchup.

The schools provided several musical opportunities for students. School choirs, quartets, trios and vocal ensembles performed locally and traveled to churches, schools, and conferences throughout the Northeast United States.  There was an active drama program at the school, and students were also active in the local chapter of the National Honor Society and the DAR

Glen Cove Bible College
In 1960 the board of directors voted to establish a post secondary Bible Institute on the same campus.  Eventually, the curriculum was expanded into three separate tracks.  A one-year certificate program and a four-year college program were added to the three year diploma track.  The first graduating class of 1963 included nine members, and by its tenth year of existence enrollment had increased to ninety-five students with a graduating class of 14.

"In 1973, Governor Kenneth Curtis signed into law an act naming Glen Cove Bible School the Glen Cove Bible College."  The approval was based on the recommendation of a select committee of the Maine Department of Education and the unanimous approval of the 106th Maine Legislature's Education Committee.  The College was granted state approval to award the bachelor of religious education degree (B.R.E.) to graduates of the four-year program. All students in that program were required to complete 128 credit hours of study including Bible (36 credit hours), liberal arts (36 credit hours), a minor in theology, Christian education, missions (18 credit hours) or music (25 hours).

Retreats and Conferences
Both the Academy and the College hosted winter carnivals for teenagers.  These served as an outreach to young people and a student recruitment opportunity.  Bible and missionary conferences were also hosted on the campus during the school year and during summer months.  Missionaries from around the globe and popular Bible teachers were featured at these conferences which were also open to the general public.

History
The school opened in 1958 as a state approved class A secondary school with 34 students and met in renovated classrooms of the Calvary Baptist Church in Pittsfield, Maine. One senior was graduated in June 1959. During that year the Board of Directors began the process of finding a suitable site for a boarding school.

They began to investigate the Warrenton estate in the Glen Cove section of Rockport near Rockland Maine. The estate consisted of sixty-seven acres of land with 2500 feet of ocean front and a main house of thirty-five rooms and ten baths, a carriage house and an outlying barn, all in good condition. The property, formerly a private residence adjacent to the Samoset Resort, had recently been used by a research organization and had been vacant for two years.  The former owners, The Round Table Foundation, allowed the school to occupy and use the property pending the settling of the title. This was accomplished a year later on September 28, 1960. Christian Schools, Inc. was the parent organization that included a Christian elementary school in Canaan, Maine, Glen Cove Christian Academy and Bible School in Glen Cove, Maine, and was instrumental in the founding of Dublin Christian Academy, in Dublin, New Hampshire. President of Christian Schools, Inc., Harold Duff, was also called upon by parent groups across New England to consult on prospects for establishing Christian schools in other locations.

Founding President

Harold Duff grew up on a potato farm in East Hodgdon, Maine on the Canada–US border.  As a young man he farmed with his family, operated heavy equipment and worked on the Bangor and Aroostook Rail Road.  In 1943 he enlisted in the Army Air Corp and served on a B17 as a flight engineer. He was awarded the Distinguished Flying Cross for his service during WWII.  Upon his return to the United States, he enrolled as a student at Bob Jones University in Greenville South Carolina where he received a bachelor's degree and a master's degree in Bible.  After graduation, Duff taught at New Brunswick Bible Institute in Victoria, New Brunswick, Canada for six years before being called upon to help establish a new Christian high school in central Maine.  In 1977, he left Christian Schools, Inc. to become headmaster of the Pioneer Valley Christian Academy (PVCA) in East Longmeadow, MA.

Alumni of Note
Donna Loring,  Tribal Representative of the Penobscot Nation in the state of Maine.

History of the Warrenton Estate
The original six acres of Warrenton Park was actually carved out of an alder grove by David Smith.
   It eventually grew to approximately 500 acres and was landscaped and developed to include two shingled cottages and numerous walking paths and carriage roads that could be accessed by guests of the adjacent Samoset Resort. Warrenton, designed by legendary architect Stanford White, was the first home to be built on the estate in 1886. George Warren Smith who spent his last days there died at the age of 97 in 1922. Clifford Lodge, the home of Benjamin F. Smith, was built in 1896 and burned in 1940.  Owned by Gwendolyn Sharpe at the time, it had just undergone a $30,000 renovation.  The fire, of undetermined origin, began in the maids quarters of the unoccupied building.

The Roundtable Foundation
In 1950, a portion of the Warrenton estate was purchased by The Round Table Foundation. The organization was founded by Dr. Henry K. Andrija Puharich to conduct experiments in electrobiology. Its laboratory was initially located in Camden, Maine in a barn owned by Roy Hines.  The purchase of the Warrenton property as a permanent location for the laboratory was made possible, in part, by a grant from General Foods Corporation for the purpose of experimentation in "taste physiology".  Dr. Puharich and the Round Table Foundation became more widely known for their research in extrasensory perception.  Collaborators included famous psychics Peter Hurkos, Harry Stump, and Eileen Garrett. Puharich also hosted a number of celebrities such as author, Aldous Huxley, Alice Astor Bouverie, and Henry Belk.

References

External links
Historical Archive for Glen Cove Christian Academy and Bible College
Pioneer Valley Christian School
 A Maine Family of Smiths by Benjamin F. Smith

Defunct Christian schools in the United States
Defunct schools in Maine
Educational institutions established in 1959
1959 establishments in Maine